is the twentieth studio album by Japanese rock band Buck-Tick released on September 28, 2016. It is the first album released after Lingua Sounda was made a sub-label of Victor, making it their first album since 1996's Cosmos to be released through Victor. Takeshi Ueda of AA= and The Mad Capsule Markets performs as a guest on the track "Pinoa Icchio -Odoru Atom-". The album was 5th on the Oricon weekly chart and 6th on Billboard Japan's album chart.

Track listing

Personnel
Buck-Tick
 Atsushi Sakurai – vocals
 Hisashi Imai – guitar, vocals
 Hidehiko Hoshino – guitar
 Yutaka Higuchi – bass
 Toll Yagami – drums

References

External links
 

2016 albums
Buck-Tick albums
Japanese-language albums
Industrial rock albums